The 1978 Giro d'Italia was the 61st edition of the Giro d'Italia, one of cycling's Grand Tours. The field consisted of 130 riders, and 90 riders finished the race.

By rider

By nationality

References

1978 Giro d'Italia
1978